The Prag Cine Awards North-East 2016 ceremony, presented by the Prag Network, honoured the actors, technical achievements, and films censored in 2015 from Assam and rest of Northeast India, took place on May 14–15, 2016 at the Church field in Tezpur, Assam. Film fraternities from Northeast as well as Bollywood personalities such as Suniel Shetty, Meiyang Chang were present in this event.

Actress Bidya Rao was honored with the lifetime Achievement Award for her contribution towards the Assamese film Industry, while model and actress Dipannita Sharma and sound engineer Amrit Pritam Dutta were presented with "Golden Icon" award. Pranjal Saikia received best actor award for Lokabandhoo and the best actress award has gone to Urmila Mahanta for Antareen. Manjul Baruah directed Antareen won the best film award, while Onaatah, Khasi language film from Meghalaya, won the best film north-east award.

Winners and nominees 
In this edition of Prag Cine Awards, awards were given in 19 different categories to the Assamese films produced from Assam which were censored in the year of 2015. Kothanodi and Antareen topped the nomination list with ten nominations each.

Awards for films from Assam 
Winners are listed first and highlighted in boldface.

{| class=wikitable
|-
! style="background:#EEDD82; width:50%" | Best Film
! style="background:#EEDD82; width:50%" | Best Popular Film
|-
| rowspan=3 valign="top" |
Antareen
Bokul
Kothanodi
| valign="top" |
Khel - The Game
|-
! style="background:#EEDD82; width:50%" | Best Film other than Assamese
|-
| valign="top" |
Dau Huduni Methai – Bodo
|-
! style="background:#EEDD82" | Best Director
! style="background:#EEDD82" | Best Debut Director
|-
| valign="top" |
Reema Borah – Bokul
Bhaskar Hazarika – Kothanodi
Ratan Sil Sarma – Marksheet
| valign="top" |
Ratan Sil Sarma – Marksheet
Bhaskar Hazarika – Kothanodi
Manjul Baruah – Antareen
|-
! style="background:#EEDD82" | Best Actor Male
! style="background:#EEDD82" | Best Actor Female
|-
| valign="top" |
Pranjal Saikia – Lokabandhoo
Ashok Singh – Cactus
Boloram Das – Antareen
Lakhi Borthakur – Jajabor
| valign="top" |
Urmila Mahanta – Antareen
Barsha Rani Bishaya – Khel - The Game
Mitali Dey – Saat Nomboror Sandhanat
Prastuti Parashar – Mriganabhi
|-
! style="background:#EEDD82" | Best Supporting Actor Male
! style="background:#EEDD82" | Best Supporting Actor Female
|-
| valign="top" |
Kulada Kumar Bhattacharya – Cactus
Arun Nath – Antareen
Kopil Bora – Kothanodi
| valign="top" |
Kasvi Sarma – Kothanodi
Aparna Dutta Choudhury – Antareen
Simi Ryan – Cactus
|-
! style="background:#EEDD82" | Best Music Direction
! style="background:#EEDD82" | Best Lyrics
|-
| valign="top" |
Tarali Sarma – Mriganabhi
Amar Nath Hazarika – Kothanodi
Anil Saikia – Saat Nomboror Sandhanat
| valign="top" |
Tarali Sarma – Antareen
Ibson Lal Baruah – Marksheet - Pagol Uxaah
Keshaba Nanda Goswami – Nodi Mathu Boi
|-
! style="background:#EEDD82" | Best Playback Singer Male
! style="background:#EEDD82" | Best Playback Singer Female
|-
| valign="top" |
Mrinal Baishnab – Marksheet - Loralir Dhemali
Jitul Sonowal – Love in Bangkok
Saurav Mahanta – Nodi Mathu Boi
| valign="top" |
Madhusmita Borthakur – Khel - The Game
Geeta Shree – Sat Nomboror Xondhanot
Tarali Sarma – Antareen
|-
! style="background:#EEDD82" | Best Cinematography
! style="background:#EEDD82" | Best Film Editing
|-
| valign="top" |
Suman Dowerah – Antareen
Arup Manna – Cactus
Suraj Kumar Duwara – Mriganabhi
| valign="top" |
Rantu Chetia and Jasir Imtiaz – Bokul
Hiranya Kalita – Cactus
Ratan Sil Sarma – Marksheet
|-
! style="background:#EEDD82" | Best Screenplay
! style="background:#EEDD82" | Best Choreography
|-
| valign="top" |
Bhaskar Hazarika – Kothanodi
Arup Manna – Cactus
Himjyoti Talukdar – Marksheet
| valign="top" |
Uday Shankar – Khel - The Game
Pankaj Ingti – Saat Nomboror Sandhanat
Upashana Mahanta – Nodi Mathu Boi
|-
! style="background:#EEDD82" | Best Sound Recordist
! style="background:#EEDD82" | Best Art Direction
|-
| valign="top" |
Bibek Basumatary – Bokul
Jatin Sharma – Kothanodi
Jatin Sharma and Diganta Bordoloi – '| valign="top" |Gulok Saha – KothanodiRama Ray and Anup Hazarika – Antareen
Sandeep Patil and Reema Bora – Bokul
|-
! style="background:#EEDD82" | Best Makeup
! style="background:#EEDD82" | Best Costume
|-
| valign="top" |Sanku Baruah and Bishwajit Das – LokabandhooAkash Gogoi and Subhash Shrestha – Khel - The Game
Babul Das and Bishwajit Kalita – Mriganabhi
| valign="top" |Rani Dutta Baruah – KothanodiPrashanta Ghose and Adityam – Khel - The Game
Sehnaz Sultan – Saat Nomboror Sandhanat
|}

 Awards for films from rest of northeast India 
Winners are listed first and highlighted in boldface'.

 Honorary awards 
Lifetime Achievement Award
Veteran actress Bidya Rao will be honoured with the lifetime Achievement Award for her contribution towards the Assamese film Industry.
Golden Icon Awards
Model and actress Dipannita Sharma, and sound engineer Amrit Pritam Dutta were honoured with Golden Icon Awards.
 Other awards 
 Jury's Special Mention: Aditya Malla Buzarbaruah and Abhijit Chowdhury – Marksheet Jury's Special Mention: Nilanjan Datta – The Head Hunter''
 Best Critic (Writing on Cinema): Manoj Barpujari

See also 
List of Assamese films of the 2010s

References

Cinema of Assam
2015 film awards